Matías Edgardo Verdún (born 18 January 1997) is an Argentine professional footballer who plays as a midfielder.

Career
Having played in the Nueva Chicago youth system, Verdún moved to Comunicaciones in 2016. He made his professional debut under manager Sergio Leroy in April 2018 against Colegiales, coming on in place of Julián Antonio Barría in 1–3 victory; with his next appearance in Primera B Metropolitana arriving twelve months later versus San Miguel. In July 2019, Verdún made a move to Luján. He left after three appearances in Primera C Metropolitana.

Career statistics
.

References

External links

1997 births
Living people
Place of birth missing (living people)
Argentine footballers
Association football midfielders
Primera B Metropolitana players
Club Comunicaciones footballers
Club Luján footballers